Jamie Russo (born 16 April 1981) is an Australian former professional rugby league footballer of 2000s. Russo had stints with the Sydney Roosters, Parramatta Eels and the South Sydney Rabbitohs.

Background
Russo was born in Auburn Sydney  and raised on the Sunshine Coast in Queensland, Australia.

Playing career
Russo made his first grade debut for Eastern Suburbs in Round 10 of 2001 season against Melbourne which ended in a 23–22 victory for Easts.  In 2002, Russo joined Parramatta and made two appearances for the club before being released.  In 2003. Russo joined South Sydney and played there for two seasons before being released.  In both years that Russo was at the club, Souths finished last on the table.  

In 2005, Russo moved back to Queensland and signed with the Redcliffe Dolphins.  Also in 2005, Russo was selected to play for the Queensland residents team to play against the NSW residents side.  In 2006, Russo was set to join the Canberra Raiders but the deal fell through due to salary cap restraints at the club.  In 2009, Russo joined Gateshead in England dominating the English game and going on to signing a lucrative deal at the Oldham Roughyeds.

References

1981 births
Living people
Australian rugby league players
Newcastle Thunder players
Oldham R.L.F.C. players
Parramatta Eels players
Redcliffe Dolphins players
Rugby league players from New South Wales
Rugby league five-eighths
South Sydney Rabbitohs players
Sydney Roosters players